Vesuvius Furnace may refer to:

Vesuvius Furnace (Catawba Springs, North Carolina), listed on the National Register of Historic Places in Lincoln County, North Carolina
Vesuvius Furnace (Ironton, Ohio), listed on the National Register of Historic Places in Lawrence County, Ohio